Symphlebia haenkei is a moth in the subfamily Arctiinae first described by Franz Daniel in 1952. It is found in Bolivia.

References

haenkei